The Piney Woods usually refers to a terrestrial ecoregion in the US southern states of Arkansas, Louisiana and Texas.

Piney Woods may also refer to:

 Pine forests generally
 A historic ecoregion in the US states of North Carolina, South Carolina, and Georgia, now known as the Sandhills and Inner Banks
 Piney Woods Country Life School in Piney Woods, Mississippi, United States
 Piney Woods, Michigan, an unincorporated community
 Piney Woods, Mississippi, an unincorporated community

Pineywoods may also refer to:

 Pineywoods cattle, endangered breed of landrace heritage cattle
 Pineywoods Guinea
 Pineywoods geranium
 Pineywoods dropseed
 Pineywoods goldenrod

See also
 Pine Belt (Mississippi), a region in southern Mississippi
 Pinewood (disambiguation)